"I'm Just a Singer (In a Rock and Roll Band)" is a 1973 hit single by the English progressive rock band the Moody Blues, written by the band's bassist, John Lodge. It was first released in 1972 as the final track on the album Seventh Sojourn and was later released as a single in 1973, with "For My Lady" as its B-side. It was the second single released from Seventh Sojourn, with the first being "Isn't Life Strange", which was also written by Lodge.

The song reached number 12 on the Billboard Hot 100 in the US, becoming one of their highest-charting hits in that country, but fared less well in their native UK, where it managed number 36. It was also the final single released by the Moody Blues prior to their five-year hiatus, which was agreed upon so each of the band members could pursue their own solo careers. Their next single would not be until 1978, with "Steppin' in a Slide Zone".

Billboard regarded the song as a change of pace for the Moody Blues, stating that it had a more "upbeat rock sound" than their typical songs. Cash Box predicted that it was "likely to turn gold," saying that "all indications are that it will head straight for the very top" of the charts. Classic Rock critic Malcolm Dome rated it as the Moody Blues' 6th greatest song. AllMusic critic Lindsay Planer said that "Even though this is an uptempo rocker, Lodge delves headlong into an introspective space equal to that of another significant side, 'Isn't Life Strange.'" 

The song was the last of the band's singles to feature the Chamberlin, which had recently replaced the Mellotron. The Chamberlin would later be replaced by a more modern keyboard synthesizer. A promotional music-video was filmed for "I'm Just a Singer (In a Rock and Roll Band)". This video showed the band's flautist Ray Thomas playing a baritone saxophone; however, according to keyboardist Mike Pinder, the saxophone was used just for effect in the video and the saxophone sound was produced by the Chamberlin.  The basic tracks for the song were recorded in Pinder's garage, producing a raw sound.

The song remained in the Moody Blues' live concerts throughout their career. Live performances of the song during the band's final years featured a live saxophone played by keyboardist Julie Ragins, along with Norda Mullen on flute.

"For My Lady"
The B-side of the single was "For My Lady", which was composed by Ray Thomas.  Classic Rock History critic Brian Kachejian rated "For My Lady" as the Moody Blues' 7th greatest song, saying that "The song’s bouncy flute opening had a very Irish ethnic storybook sound that took me someplace out to sea."

Personnel
 John Lodge – vocals, bass guitar
 Justin Hayward – vocals, acoustic and electric guitars
 Mike Pinder – vocals, Chamberlin, piano, tambourine
 Ray Thomas – vocals, saxophone
 Graeme Edge – drums, percussion

Chart history

Weekly charts

Year-end charts

Derivative works
 "I'm Just a Singer in a Holiday Inn", a Bob Rivers parody of this tune, appears on his 1997 album The Best of Twisted Tunes, Vol. 2.

References

1972 songs
1973 singles
Songs about rock music
Songs written by John Lodge (musician)
The Moody Blues songs